"On a Ragga Tip" is a song by British breakbeat hardcore group SL2, released as a single in 1992. The song contains samples of Jah Screechy's "Walk and Skank" and Kid 'n Play's "Gittin' Funky (UK Remix)".

The song was a success, peaking at  2 in the United Kingdom and the Netherlands, No. 3 in Ireland and No. 42 in Belgium. It remains the group's biggest and best-known song. In 1997, a remix of the song was released and reached No. 31 in the UK.

In 2015, the original SL2 version was used in a McDonald's television commercial in the UK and in 2019, it was used in a Virgin Media commercial.

Critical reception
Andy Beevers from Music Week stated that "this track continues the reggae-hardcore theme of 'Way in My Brain', the hugely popular flipside to their massive 'DJs Take Control' hit. Built around Jah Screechy's extremely catchy 'Walk and Skank', 'On a Ragga Tip' is destined for great things."

Track listing
 UK 12-inch single
A1. "On a Ragga Tip" (original mix) – 5:11
A2. "Pleasure" (original mix) – 4:05
AA1. "Changing Trax" (original mix) – 5:00
AA2. "Bassquake" (Plus 8 Mix) – 4:26

Charts and certifications

Weekly charts

Year-end charts

Certifications

Other versions and sampling

In 1992, South African singer Dr Victor interpolated the vocals and hook of "On a Ragga Tip", with added verses and instrumentation, in the song "Badayo".

In 1994, Bali Brahmbhatt and Alka Yagnik interpolated the song in "Amma Dekh Tera Munda" from the Bollywood film Stuntman.

In 2015, British electronic/house duo My Digital Enemy released an EDM remake of "On a Ragga Tip" which sampled the original SL2 version.

References

1992 songs
1992 singles
Breakbeat hardcore songs
Music Week number-one dance singles
XL Recordings singles